This is the list of episodes for The Tonight Show with Jay Leno, which aired between May 25, 1992 and May 29, 2009, with a resumed production from March 1, 2010 to February 6, 2014.

Episodes

First incarnation (1992–2009)

 List of The Tonight Show with Jay Leno episodes (1992)
 List of The Tonight Show with Jay Leno episodes (1993)
 List of The Tonight Show with Jay Leno episodes (1994)
 List of The Tonight Show with Jay Leno episodes (1995)
 List of The Tonight Show with Jay Leno episodes (1996)
 List of The Tonight Show with Jay Leno episodes (1997)
 List of The Tonight Show with Jay Leno episodes (1998)
 List of The Tonight Show with Jay Leno episodes (1999)
 List of The Tonight Show with Jay Leno episodes (2000)
 List of The Tonight Show with Jay Leno episodes (2001)
 List of The Tonight Show with Jay Leno episodes (2002)
 List of The Tonight Show with Jay Leno episodes (2003)
 List of The Tonight Show with Jay Leno episodes (2004)
 List of The Tonight Show with Jay Leno episodes (2005)
 List of The Tonight Show with Jay Leno episodes (2006)
 List of The Tonight Show with Jay Leno episodes (2007)
 List of The Tonight Show with Jay Leno episodes (2008)
 List of The Tonight Show with Jay Leno episodes (2009)

Second incarnation (2010–2014)

 List of The Tonight Show with Jay Leno episodes (2010)
 List of The Tonight Show with Jay Leno episodes (2011)
 List of The Tonight Show with Jay Leno episodes (2012)
 List of The Tonight Show with Jay Leno episodes (2013–14)

See also
 List of The Tonight Show episodes

References

External links
 
 Lineups at Interbridge 
 

Episodes
Tonight Show with Jay Leno
Tonight Show with Jay Leno